Lipari may refer to:
Lipari, town in Sicily
Mirco Lipari, Italian footballer (born 2002)